Jornal Hoje is a news program aired by the Brazilian television broadcaster TV Globo. The program is broadcast in the early afternoon from Monday to Saturday as part of a news block that also includes Praça TV and Globo Esporte. It is currently presented by César Tralli.

History 
The show premiered on 21 April 1971, almost two years after the premiere of Jornal Nacional, and replaced Show da Cidade (The City Show). Initially it was only shown in the state of the Rio de Janeiro and was then presented by Léo Batista and Luiz Jatobá.

The original idea was for a women's daily magazine, with reports on art, shows and interviews. On 3 June 1974, it began to be broadcast nationally. It was divided in sections and, with the same scenery, it had hosts in Rio de Janeiro, São Paulo and Brasilia.

The final segment brought local news from affiliated broadcasting stations, such as the TV Ribeirão (now EPTV); the local news was shown after Globo Esporte since the 1980s, with the exception of São Paulo from 1990 to 1996, when they aired São Paulo Já in the Jornal Hoje timeslot. SPTV now airs at its original timeslot at 12:00 p.m. local time since 1996.

On August 8, 2019, it was announced that Sandra Annenberg would present Globo Reporter and that Maria Júlia Coutinho would definitely take over the newscast from the end of September of the same year.

Opening credits

Since the program's inception in 1971, the opening credits regularly featured a large "H" in the intro. It previously also included the Rede Globo logo, although this was removed after 1981, with an exception in 2000 to 2001, which featured to Rede Globo logo partially obscuring the opening credits, which was also used in other program intros from the late '90s to the 2000s. Since 1986, the "H" was shaded with yellow, except in 1991 to 1999, and during 1991-94, the "H" had a grey-pink combination in a shaded form. During 1994-99, there were yellow and pink movements, stopping to form the "H".

Presenters

Main presenters
 César Tralli
 Weather forecast
 Jacqueline Brazil
 Marcelo Pereira, Jacqueline Brazil, Tiago Scheuer (Relief presenters)
 Policy Commentator
 Andreia Sadi

Other presenters 
 Zileide Silva (since 2007)
 Fábio William (since 2013)
 Marcelo Cosme (since 2019)
 Rodrigo Bocardi (2013-2016 and since 2020-2021)
 Roberto Kovalick (2019 and since 2021-2022)
 Alan Severiano (since 2021)
 Ana Paula Campos desde 2023

References

External links
 Official site

Rede Globo original programming
Brazilian television news shows
1971 Brazilian television series debuts
1970s Brazilian television series
1980s Brazilian television series
1990s Brazilian television series
2000s Brazilian television series
2010s Brazilian television series
2020s Brazilian television series
Portuguese-language television shows